Peacocks are adult male peafowl (large ground-nesting birds), known for their iridescent plumage.

Peacock or peacocks may also refer to:

Animals

Fish 
 Aulonocara ("peacocks"), endemic to East Africa
 Peacock bass (chicla), endemic to South America

Insects

Nymphalid butterflies 
Anartia, genus endemic to the Americas
 Aglais io, the European peacock
 Peacock pansy (Junonia almana), from South Asia

Swallowtail butterflies 
 Papilio blumei, the green swallowtail
 Several other South Asian Papilio species

Film and television 

Peacock (2005 film) (Kong que), a Chinese film
Peacock (2010 film), an American psychological thriller
"Peacocks", an episode of the television series Teletubbies
Peacock (streaming service), an American streaming service by NBCUniversal
The logo of American television network NBC which is often called "The Peacock Network"
Peacock Productions, the defunct long-form production unit of NBC News

Music 

Peacock Records, a record label (1949–1979)
"Peacock" (song), 2010, by Katy Perry
"Peacock", 1986, by Splash (South African band)
"Peacocks", by The Mountain Goats

Naval vessels 
Peacock-class corvette, a Royal Navy ship class
, various Royal Navy ships
, a number of U.S. Navy vessels

Places

India 
Peacock Bay, Pune, Maharashtra
Umananda Island, Guwahati, Assam (called Peacock Island by the British)

United States

Landforms 
Peacock Island (Connecticut)
Peacock Mountains, Arizona
Peacock Mountain, Washington
Peacock Peak, Arizona

Settlements and streets 
Peacock Lane, Portland, Oregon
Peacock, Texas, an unincorporated community
Peacock Township, Michigan

Elsewhere 
Peacock (St. Paul's Churchyard), a Stuart-era bookseller in London, England
Peacock Sound, Antarctica

Retail businesses 
Peacocks (clothing), a British value fashion chain
 The Peacocks (Woking), a shopping centre near London (now Victoria Place)
Peacock (St. Paul's Churchyard), a Stuart-era London bookseller
Daimaru Peacock (formerly Peacock Sangyo), a Japanese supermarket chain

Science and technology 
Peacock (star), in the constellation Pavo
Peacock ore or bornite, a mineral
Peacock Palmtop PC, a 1990s mobile device

Sport 
Saint Peter's Peacocks, athletic teams of Saint Peter's University
"The Peacocks", a nickname for the English football club Leeds United

Other uses 
Peacock (Fabergé egg), a 1908 Fabergé egg
Peacock (surname), including fictional characters

See also 
R v Peacock, a law case
The Flying Peacock, a professional wrestler from All-Star Wrestling
Pavão (disambiguation) (Portuguese for )
Pavo (disambiguation) (Latin for )
Puffery